Yulupa Creek is a  southeast-flowing perennial stream that rises on the southeastern flanks of the northern Sonoma Mountains in Sonoma County, California, United States.  This creek, which drains the eastern slopes of Bennett Mountain, is tributary to Sonoma Creek, which in turn discharges to San Pablo Bay. Yulupa Avenue in Santa Rosa is presumably named after this creek.

Course
Yulupa Creek rises in the Sonoma Mountains, on the southwestern edge of Annadel State Park near Bennett Ridge Road. It descends initially to the southeast. After about  it meets Bennett Valley Road, which it follows eastward to Warm Springs Road, where it discharges into Sonoma Creek.

Watershed
The Yulupa Creek watershed comprises an area of approximately five square miles, and is considered a viable steelhead, Oncorhynchus mykiss, spawning habitat; stream surveys conducted from 1966 to 1986 indicated significant, but declining populations of anadromous fish.   NOAA fisheries has designated the Yulupa Creek watershed as "Critical Habitat" for Oncorhychus mykiss as well as O. tshawytscha (Chinook Salmon) as of 2004.

Land use in this watershed consists of Annadel State Park usage and very low density rural single family residential development, much of which is upmarket housing stock. From the higher headwater elevations, there are expansive views of Hood Mountain and the southern Mayacamas Mountains can be seen to the north; Sonoma Valley and distantly San Francisco to the south; and Sonoma Mountain to the southwest. The area designation of most of this watershed is Kenwood, California, an unincorporated area known for its viticulture, although only a small fraction of the Yulupa Creek watershed is planted to grapes.

Flora and fauna

In addition to known spawning area for O. mykiss, Yulupa Creek has been designated as a high quality riparian zone and an identified habitat of freshwater shrimp.  Moreover, the upland watershed area is a California oak woodland, much of which is a relatively undisturbed ecosystem with considerable biodiversity. These forested areas have been characterized as some of the best examples of such woodlands.  An unusual characteristic of these forests is the high content of undisturbed prehistoric bunch grass understory, testifying to the absence of historic grazing or other agriculture.

Besides the riparian habitat, plant communities include California oak woodland, Douglas fir forest, chaparral, grassland and marsh.   The dominant plant community is the oak woodland, which has a canopy of coast live oak, Garry oak, black oak, Pacific madrone, bigleaf maple and California laurel. Occasionally in the vicinity of drainage swales and creeks, canyon live oak is found. In the oak woodlands, the dominant understory plants are native bunch grass, toyon, blackberry, western poison-oak and in drier patches coyote brush. Common animals observed include black-tailed deer, gray squirrel, raccoon, skunk and opossum. Less frequently bobcat and mountain lion are seen. There is abundant birdlife including the scrub jay, Steller's jay, acorn woodpecker, black phoebe and junco. A number of amphibians occur near the creek and its tributary elements, including the rough skinned newt, Taricha granulosa.

Geology
 
Ledson Marsh has a southern outlet to the north fork of Yulupa Creek.

The Yulupa Creek watershed was below the Pacific Ocean floor as recently as the Miocene era, around which time massive uplift and volcanic action formed the massif which comprises the headwaters higher elevations of the watershed of today. Sandstone is the dominant rock type, as a remnant of the ancient sea floor. Slopes within the headwaters area commonly range from 15 to 30 percent, and lower reaches have gradients of two to five percent. One of the major soil associations within the upper elevation riparian zone is Goulding cobbly clay loam, which contains roughly 25 percent cobblestones, as well as some basaltic exposures, betraying the volcanic past of the Sonoma Mountains formation. Much of the soil type in the Yulupa Creek riparian zone consists of Laniger loam, with rhyolite outcrops, another relic of the igneous history.

Bridges

There are two significant public roadway bridges across Yulupa Creek.

See also
Annadel State Park
Graham Creek
List of watercourses in the San Francisco Bay Area
Pomo people
Taylor Mountain

References

Rivers of Sonoma County, California
Sonoma Mountains
Tributaries of Sonoma Creek
Rivers of Northern California